Franz Galich  (January 8, 1951 Guatemala – February 3, 2007 Managua) was a Guatemalan writer and professor of literature who developed his work in Nicaragua.

His work 
Novels

 Huracán corazón del cielo, 1995 (Lit. Hurricane heart of the sky)
 Managua Salsa City, 1999 (Salsa Managua City)
 En Este Mundo Matraca, 2005 (In This World, Rattle)
 Y te diré quién eres, 2006 (And I'll Tell You Who You Are)

Short Story

 Ficcionario inédito, 1979 (Ficcionario Unpublished)
 La Princesa de Onix y otros relatos, 1989 (The Princess of Onix and other stories)
 El Ratero y otros relatos, 2003 (The Thief and Other Stories)

References 
 This article was initially translated from the Spanish Wikipedia.

Guatemalan male writers
Guatemalan male short story writers
Guatemalan short story writers
1951 births
2007 deaths